The Matchless Model X is a Matchless motorcycle made from 1929 to 1940. There were yearly modifications and in 1937 the Model X was completely redesigned as a fast touring motorcycle.  Production ended with outbreak of World War II.

Development
The Matchless Model X was developed for V-twin enthusiasts and had a specially reinforced rear frame for heavy-duty sidecar work. At the end of 1936 the Model X was upgraded and rebranded the Sports Tourist, with a shorter wheelbase frame which improved roadholding and steering. The Motor Cycle road tested the Model X in May 1937 and noted that the steering was light but even when cruising at over  it did "not become so light as to necessitate-use of the damper."

Brough Superior
In the lead up to World War II Brough Superior began using  990 cc Matchless V-twin side valve engines for their SS80 and overhead-valve engines for the SS100.

References

External links
 Matchless Model X Video

Matchless motorcycles
Motorcycles introduced in the 1920s